The Chrysler Citadel was a concept car created by Chrysler. It was shown at the 2000 Washington DC Auto Show. The Citadel was a hybrid with good performance and the inspiration for the production-model Pacifica. The Citadel name was later used for a trim level on the 2011 Dodge Durango.

Engine and Performance
The Citadel is powered by a 189 kW (253-hp), 3.5-L, V6 gasoline engine in the rear wheels and an electric one in the front wheels. This combination of powers gives better performance in the rear. The gasoline engine gives out  and an extra  from the electric motor. The Citadel uses rear-wheel drive (RWD).

References
Info on the Citadel @ ConceptCarz.com
Info From Automotive Engineering Online

Citadel